Julio Cedeño (born 16 October 1992) is a Dominican Republic weightlifter. He is a two-time gold medalist in the men's 73kg event at the Pan American Weightlifting Championships (2021 and 2022). He won the bronze medal in the men's 73kg event at the 2019 Pan American Games held in Lima, Peru.

Career 

He won two medals in his events at the 2018 Central American and Caribbean Games held in Barranquilla, Colombia.

At the 2019 Pan American Weightlifting Championships held in Guatemala City, Guatemala, he finished in 4th place in the men's 73kg event. A few months later, he won the bronze medal in the men's 73kg event at the 2019 Pan American Games held in Lima, Peru. He finished in 4th place in his event at the 2020 Pan American Weightlifting Championships held in Santo Domingo, Dominican Republic.

In 2021, he won the gold medal in his event at the Pan American Weightlifting Championships held in Guayaquil, Ecuador. He also won the gold medal in his event at the 2022 Pan American Weightlifting Championships held in Bogotá, Colombia.

Achievements

References

External links 
 

Living people
1992 births
Dominican Republic male weightlifters
Competitors at the 2018 Central American and Caribbean Games
Central American and Caribbean Games medalists in weightlifting
Central American and Caribbean Games silver medalists for the Dominican Republic
Central American and Caribbean Games bronze medalists for the Dominican Republic
Weightlifters at the 2019 Pan American Games
Medalists at the 2019 Pan American Games
Pan American Games bronze medalists for the Dominican Republic
Pan American Games medalists in weightlifting
Pan American Weightlifting Championships medalists
21st-century Dominican Republic people